LaBradford Corvey Smith (born April 3, 1969) is an American retired professional basketball player.

Career
Smith went to Bay City High School in Bay City, Texas. He played collegiately at the University of Louisville before being selected by the Washington Bullets in the 1st round (19th overall) of the 1991 NBA draft.

Smith played in three NBA seasons from 1991 to 1994. His best year as a pro came during the 1992–93 season as a member of the Bullets, when he appeared in 69 games and averaged 9.3 ppg. During the 1993–94 season, he was waived by the Bullets and spent the rest of the season playing for the Sacramento Kings. He later on played in the CBA and overseas in Europe. Smith averaged 6.7 ppg in his professional career.

Smith is known for scoring 37 points on Michael Jordan in a road game against the Chicago Bulls on March 19, 1993. He shot 15–20 from the floor, and 7–7 from the foul line. However, the Bullets lost 104–99. Jordan claimed Smith had the audacity to say "Nice game, Mike" after the game. The following day the teams played again in Washington D.C. Jordan proceeded to score 36 points in the first half as retribution for the alleged slight from the previous day. It turns out “Nice game, Mike” was never actually said, but was a made up story by Michael Jordan to motivate himself to perform better against Smith.

References

External links
NBA stats at Basketballreference.com

1969 births
Living people
African-American basketball players
American expatriate basketball people in Poland
American expatriate basketball people in Spain
American men's basketball players
Baloncesto León players
Baltimore Bayrunners players
Basketball players from Texas
Liga ACB players
Louisville Cardinals men's basketball players
McDonald's High School All-Americans
MKS Znicz Basket Pruszków players
Parade High School All-Americans (boys' basketball)
People from Bay City, Texas
Quad City Thunder players
Rapid City Thrillers players
Sacramento Kings players
Shooting guards
Śląsk Wrocław basketball players
Washington Bullets draft picks
Washington Bullets players
21st-century African-American people
20th-century African-American sportspeople